Bora Vang (王博, born April 9, 1987) is a  Chinese-born Turkish male national table tennis player.

He won the gold medal in the mixed doubles event at the 2010 European Mixed Double Championships held in Subotica, Serbia together with his Turkish teammate Şirin He. In 2012, he and his Turkish teammate Melek Hu won the silver medal at the European Mixed Double Championships held in Buzau, Romania.

Vang qualified for the 2012 Summer Olympics after the World Qualification Championship held in Doha, Qatar.

At the 2013 Mediterranean Games held in Mersin, Turkey, he won the silver medal in the singles event.

Achievements

References

1987 births
Living people
Turkish people of Chinese descent
Turkish male table tennis players
Chinese male table tennis players
Chinese emigrants to Turkey
Table tennis players at the 2012 Summer Olympics
Olympic table tennis players of Turkey
Converts to Islam
Mediterranean Games gold medalists for Turkey
Mediterranean Games silver medalists for Turkey
Competitors at the 2013 Mediterranean Games
Table tennis players from Shijiazhuang
Naturalised table tennis players
Mediterranean Games medalists in table tennis
Turkish sportspeople of Chinese descent